is a Japanese comedy manga series written and illustrated by . It was serialized in the  manga magazine Hana to Yume from 1987 to 1988 and later collected as three  volumes by Hakusensha. Its soundtrack was composed by rock duo supergroup Metalchicks. The film was screened internationally under the title Arch Angels and licensed for distribution in North America by Sentai Filmworks in 2016.

Characters
 
 Portrayed by: Juri Ueno
 
 Portrayed by: Megumi Seki
 
 Portrayed by: Airi Taira
 
 Portrayed by: Yusuke Iseya
 
 Portrayed by: Rinko Kikuchi

References

External links
 

1987 manga
2006 films
Comedy anime and manga
2000s Japanese-language films
Hakusensha franchises
Hakusensha manga
Live-action films based on manga
Sentai Filmworks
Shōjo manga
Supernatural anime and manga
2000s Japanese films